Border Warz is a 2004 thriller film directed by Rob Walker and released by Trinity Home Entertainment.

The film is about a pair of women who try to investigate a drug cartel.

References

External links

2004 films
2004 crime thriller films
2000s English-language films